Anthony "Jayjay" Helterbrand  (born Lamberto Romero Vicente, Jr. on October 14, 1976) is a Filipino-American basketball player for the Boracay Islanders of the Pilipinas Super League. He previously played with the Barangay Ginebra San Miguel of the Philippine Basketball Association (PBA). Known by many as Helter Skelter, he is also known, along with backcourt tandem Mark Caguioa, as one-half of the so-called, The Fast and the Furious.

Professional career
He played one game for the Batangas Blades in the Metropolitan Basketball Association before signing with the Barangay Ginebra Kings in March 2000. He was recruited by Ginebra through coach Ron Jacobs to play back up for Bal David as preparation to supplant him in the starting lineup.

Helterbrand started being noticed when he began coming into the game with eventual 2001 PBA Rookie of the Year Mark Caguioa. Their exciting play led to them being called as the "Bandana Brothers" for the headbands they wear during games. During the 2004 PBA season, the fantastic duo were tagged as "The Fast and The Furious," the moniker has since been used to describe them. His tandem with Mark Caguioa is one of the most popular and arguably the best backcourt tandem in the league history.

In 2003, he went back to the States after his first contract with Ginebra expired and negotiation for a new one fell through. He came back at the start of 2004 and was a major contributor in the team's back-to-back championships that year.

Injury sidelined him for five months at the start of 2005 but has mainly recovered and even won two MVP awards for the year, the Brunei Cup and the 2005 PBA All-Stars. He is considered to be one of the best point guards in the league.

After he returned to Ginebra, he quickly made an impact and was named the Comeback Player of the Year by the PBA Press Corps. He assumed the starting point guard chores after Bal David got injured and was subsequently released. He was also named MVP in Team Pilipinas' victorious run in the Sultan Cup in Brunei.

In 2008, he was again included in the RP Training Pool headed by Coach Yeng Guiao.

In 2009, Helterband was awarded the Best Player of the Fiesta Conference for leading the Kings to the finals, and he eventually won the Season MVP. However, the Team Pilipinas couldn't elevate to a much higher finish as they lost to the Korean national team in the battle for 7th place in the 2009 FIBA Asia Championship. An unusual Helterbrand finished his stint with a 1–11 from the three point area.

On June 8, 2009, he was awarded the 2008–2009 PBA season MVP, his first MVP award as a professional since entering the league in 2000.

In August 2015, Helterbrand announced his retirement from the game of basketball at the end of the 2015–16 PBA season. However, after Ginebra won the 2016 Governors' Cup, he announced that he will play for one more season. After the 2016–17 PBA season concluded, Helterbrand announced his retirement after Ginebra winning the 2017 Governor's Cup championship.

PBA career statistics

Season-by-season averages

|-
| align=left | 
| align=left | Barangay Ginebra
| 27 || 22.9 || .399 || .313 || .750 || 3.0 || 1.6 || .9 || .1 || 8.9
|-
| align=left | 
| align=left | Barangay Ginebra
| 52 || 21.8 || .407 || .263 || .853 || 2.7 || 2.2 || .7 || .0 || 7.9
|-
| align=left | 
| align=left | Barangay Ginebra
| 27 || 19.0 || .390 || .385 || .765 || 2.5 || 2.4 || .7 || .0 || 4.6
|-
| align=left | 
| align=left | Barangay Ginebra
| 52 || 30.2 || .441 || .408 || .780 || 3.6 || 4.9 || 1.0 || .1 || 11.6
|-
| align=left | 
| align=left | Barangay Ginebra
| 42 || 35.6 || .426 || .338 || .741 || 4.5 || 5.1 || 1.1 || .1 || 14.4
|-
| align=left | 
| align=left | Barangay Ginebra
| 30 || 35.6 || .401 || .292 || .696 || 4.7 || 8.5 || 1.0 || .0 || 13.1
|-
| align=left | 
| align=left | Barangay Ginebra
| 45 || 35.8 || .275 || .367 || .704 || 4.7 || 6.5 || .8 || .0 || 18.1
|-
| align=left | 
| align=left | Barangay Ginebra
| 46 || 36.0 || .398 || .374 || .811 || 3.8 || 5.0 || .9 || .0 || 17.6
|-
| align=left | 
| align=left | Barangay Ginebra
| 36 || 28.7 || .369 || .285 || .705 || 3.3 || 4.6 || .9 || .1 || 8.6
|-
| align=left | 
| align=left | Barangay Ginebra
| 29 || 19.7 || .369 || .280 || .542 || 2.2 || 2.7 || .9 || .0 || 5.4
|-
| align=left | 
| align=left | Barangay Ginebra
| 34 || 24.1 || .368 || .339 || .731 || 2.2 || 3.5 || .8 || .0 || 7.2
|-
| align=left | 
| align=left | Barangay Ginebra
| 49 || 20.7 || .344 || .317 || .676 || 2.7 || 2.5 || .4 || .1 || 6.6
|-
| align=left | 
| align=left | Barangay Ginebra
| 41 || 15.9 || .370 || .288 || .826 || 1.9 || 2.0 || .4 || .1 || 5.2
|-
| align=left | 
| align=left | Barangay Ginebra
| 26 || 12.9 || .278 || .231 || .688 || 1.6 || 1.7 || .4 || .0 || 2.8
|-
| align=left | 
| align=left | Barangay Ginebra
| 35 || 7.3 || .315 || .228 || .250 || 1.1 || .6 || .3 || .0 || 1.7
|-
| align=left | 
| align=left | Barangay Ginebra
| 19 || 6.5 || .206 || .130 || .600 || .6 || 1.2 || .3 || .0 || 1.1
|-class=sortbottom
| align=center colspan=2 | Career
| 590 || 24.5 || .375 || .329 || .741 || 3.0 || 3.6 || .7 || .1 || 9.1

Personal life
Helterbrand is in a relationship to Filipina actress RR Enriquez.

References

External links
Who is Helterbrand?
 Helterbrand Basketball Statistics
 Mark Caguioa's College Basketball Statistics
Barangay Ginebra Kings
Ginebra Online

1976 births
Living people
Barangay Ginebra San Miguel players
Filipino emigrants to the United States
Kentucky State Thorobreds basketball players
Philippine Basketball Association All-Stars
Philippines men's national basketball team players
Filipino men's basketball players
Point guards
Shooting guards
Basketball players from Quezon City
Maharlika Pilipinas Basketball League players